Nasutitermes is a genus of termites with a tropical distribution world-wide.

Species
The Termite Catalogue lists the following:

 Nasutitermes acajutlae
 Nasutitermes acangussu
 Nasutitermes acutus
 Nasutitermes aduncus
 Nasutitermes alticola
 Nasutitermes amboinensis
 Nasutitermes anamalaiensis
 Nasutitermes anjiensis
 Nasutitermes anoniensis
 Nasutitermes aquilinus
 Nasutitermes araujoi
 Nasutitermes arborum
 Nasutitermes arenarius
 Nasutitermes aruensis
 Nasutitermes atripennis
 Nasutitermes balingtauagensis
 Nasutitermes banksi
 Nasutitermes bannaensis
 Nasutitermes bashanensis
 Nasutitermes benjamini
 Nasutitermes bikpelanus
 Nasutitermes bivalens
 Nasutitermes boengiensis
 Nasutitermes boetoni
 Nasutitermes bolivari
 Nasutitermes bolivianus
 Nasutitermes brachynasutus
 Nasutitermes brevioculatus
 Nasutitermes brevipilus
 Nasutitermes brevirostris
 Nasutitermes brunneus
 Nasutitermes bulbiceps
 Nasutitermes bulbus
 Nasutitermes callimorphus
 Nasutitermes camerunensis
 Nasutitermes carnarvonensis
 Nasutitermes castaneus
 Nasutitermes celebensis
 Nasutitermes centraliensis
 Nasutitermes ceylonicus
 Nasutitermes changningensis
 Nasutitermes chapmani
 Nasutitermes chaquimayensis
 Nasutitermes cherraensis
 Nasutitermes chhotanii
 Nasutitermes choui
 Nasutitermes chrysopleura
 Nasutitermes coalescens
 Nasutitermes colimae
 Nasutitermes communis
 Nasutitermes comorensis
 Nasutitermes comstockae
 Nasutitermes corniger (Motschulsky, 1855)type species (as Eutermes costalis Holmgren, 1910)
 Nasutitermes corporaali
 Nasutitermes coxipoensis
 Nasutitermes crassicornis
 Nasutitermes crassus
 Nasutitermes curtinasus
 Nasutitermes dasyopsis
 Nasutitermes dendrophilus
 Nasutitermes devrayi
 Nasutitermes diabolus
 Nasutitermes dimorphus
 Nasutitermes dixoni
 Nasutitermes dobonensis
 Nasutitermes dolichorhinos
 Nasutitermes dudgeoni
 Nasutitermes dunensis
 Nasutitermes ecuadorianus
 Nasutitermes ehrhardti
 Nasutitermes elegantulus
 Nasutitermes emersoni
 Nasutitermes ephratae
 Nasutitermes eucalypti
 Nasutitermes exitiosus
 Nasutitermes fabricii
 Nasutitermes falciformis
 Nasutitermes fengkaiensis
 Nasutitermes ferranti
 Nasutitermes feytaudi
 Nasutitermes fletcheri
 Nasutitermes fulleri
 Nasutitermes fumigatus
 Nasutitermes fuscipennis
 Nasutitermes gaigei
 Nasutitermes gardneri
 Nasutitermes gardneriformis
 Nasutitermes garoensis
 Nasutitermes glabritergus
 Nasutitermes globiceps
 Nasutitermes gracilirostris
 Nasutitermes gracilis
 Nasutitermes grandinasus
 Nasutitermes graveolus
 Nasutitermes guayanae
 Nasutitermes guizhouensis
 Nasutitermes haddoensis
 Nasutitermes havilandi
 Nasutitermes hejiangensis
 Nasutitermes heterodon
 Nasutitermes hexianensis
 Nasutitermes hirticeps
 Nasutitermes horni
 Nasutitermes huangshanensis
 Nasutitermes hubbardi
 Nasutitermes inclinasus
 Nasutitermes indicola
 Nasutitermes infuscatus
 Nasutitermes itapocuensis
 Nasutitermes jacobsoni
 Nasutitermes jalpaigurensis
 Nasutitermes jaraguae
 Nasutitermes javanicus
 Nasutitermes jiangxiensis
 Nasutitermes johoricus
 Nasutitermes kali
 Nasutitermes kemneri
 Nasutitermes kempae
 Nasutitermes kimberleyensis
 Nasutitermes kinoshitai
 Nasutitermes koiari
 Nasutitermes krishna
 Nasutitermes lacustris
 Nasutitermes latifrons
 Nasutitermes latus
 Nasutitermes leponcei
 Nasutitermes lividus
 Nasutitermes llinquipatensis
 Nasutitermes longiarticulatus
 Nasutitermes longinasoides
 Nasutitermes longinasus
 Nasutitermes longipennis
 Nasutitermes longirostratus
 Nasutitermes longirostris
 Nasutitermes longwangshanensis
 Nasutitermes lujae
 Nasutitermes luzonicus
 Nasutitermes machengensis
 Nasutitermes macrocephalus
 Nasutitermes magnus
 Nasutitermes maheensis
 Nasutitermes major
 Nasutitermes makassarensis
 Nasutitermes mangshanensis
 Nasutitermes maniseri
 Nasutitermes matangensis
 Nasutitermes mauritianus
 Nasutitermes maximus
 Nasutitermes medoensis
 Nasutitermes meinerti
 Nasutitermes meridianus
 Nasutitermes mindanensis
 Nasutitermes minimus
 Nasutitermes minor
 Nasutitermes mirabilis
 Nasutitermes mojosensis
 Nasutitermes mollis
 Nasutitermes montanae
 Nasutitermes moratus
 Nasutitermes motu
 Nasutitermes muli
 Nasutitermes myersi
 Nasutitermes neonanus
 Nasutitermes neoparvus
 Nasutitermes nigriceps
 Nasutitermes nomadensis
 Nasutitermes nordenskioldi
 Nasutitermes novarumhebridarum
 Nasutitermes obscurus
 Nasutitermes obtusimandibulus
 Nasutitermes octopilis
 Nasutitermes oculatus
 Nasutitermes olidus
 Nasutitermes orthonasus
 Nasutitermes oshimai
 Nasutitermes ovatus
 Nasutitermes ovipennis
 Nasutitermes palaoensis
 Nasutitermes panayensis
 Nasutitermes parviceps
 Nasutitermes parvonasutus
 Nasutitermes parvus
 Nasutitermes perparvus
 Nasutitermes peruanus
 Nasutitermes pictus
 Nasutitermes pilosus
 Nasutitermes pinocchio
 Nasutitermes planiusculus
 Nasutitermes pluriarticulatus
 Nasutitermes pluvialis
 Nasutitermes princeps
 Nasutitermes proatripennis
 Nasutitermes profuscipennis
 Nasutitermes projectus
 Nasutitermes proximus
 Nasutitermes qimenensis
 Nasutitermes qingjiensis
 Nasutitermes rectangularis
 Nasutitermes regularis
 Nasutitermes retus
 Nasutitermes rippertii
 Nasutitermes roboratus
 Nasutitermes rotundatus
 Nasutitermes rotundus
 Nasutitermes saleierensis
 Nasutitermes sanctaeanae
 Nasutitermes sandakensis
 Nasutitermes schoutedeni
 Nasutitermes seghersi
 Nasutitermes shangchengensis
 Nasutitermes simaluris
 Nasutitermes similis
 Nasutitermes simulans
 Nasutitermes sinensis
 Nasutitermes smithi
 Nasutitermes stricticeps
 Nasutitermes subtibetanus
 Nasutitermes subtibialis
 Nasutitermes suknensis
 Nasutitermes surinamensis
 Nasutitermes takasagoensis
 Nasutitermes tandoni
 Nasutitermes tatarendae
 Nasutitermes taylori
 Nasutitermes thanensis
 Nasutitermes tianmuensis
 Nasutitermes tiantongensis
 Nasutitermes tibetanus
 Nasutitermes timoriensis
 Nasutitermes tipuanicus
 Nasutitermes torresi
 Nasutitermes tredecimarticulatus
 Nasutitermes triloki
 Nasutitermes triodiae
 Nasutitermes tsaii
 Nasutitermes tungsalangensis
 Nasutitermes unduliceps
 Nasutitermes vadoni
 Nasutitermes vallis
 Nasutitermes vishnu
 Nasutitermes walkeri
 Nasutitermes wheeleri
 Nasutitermes xingshanensis

Note: "N. hainanensis" is probably Sinonasutitermes hainanensis Li & Ping, 1986

References

External links
 Metagenomic and functional analysis of hindgut microbiota of a wood-feeding higher termite Nature 450, 560-565 (22 November 2007)
 

 
Termite genera